Mattheussens is a Dutch surname. Notable people with the surname include:

 Maria Mattheussens-Fikkers (born 1949), Dutch field hockey player
 Marieke Veenhoven-Mattheussens (born 1984), Dutch field hockey player, daughter of Maria

Dutch-language surnames